State Route 67 (SR 67) is a state-maintained highway in northeastern Tennessee, including a four-lane divided highway segments in both Washington County and Carter County, and part of a significant two-lane segment passing over the Butler Bridge some  above the TVA Watauga Reservoir (also referred locally to as Watauga Lake) near Butler in Johnson County, Tennessee.

Route description

Washington County
SR 67 begins as Cherokee Road as a 2-lane secondary highway in Washington County in Lamar at an intersection with SR 81. The highway goes to pass through the community before leaving Lamar and continuing east through rural areas before entering Johnson City. SR 67 then passes through a couple of neighborhoods before coming to an intersection with US 321 and SR 381 (University Parkway), where SR 67 becomes concurrent with US 321 and becomes a primary highway. They then travel east as a 4-lane divided highway through the south side of the city to an interchange with I-26/US 23/US 19W (Exit 24), where the highway becomes a freeway and has an interchange with Milligan Highway/Legion Street before crossing into Carter County and immediately entering Elizabethton.

Carter County

US 321/SR 67 gains some modest elevation before finally rolling over a significant slope and finally arriving at cautioned marked sloped curve just before the freeway segment ends at an at-grade intersection with SR 359 (Milligan Highway).

Elizabethton

At the SR 359/Milligan Highway exit, US 321/SR 67 continues on into Elizabethton as Elk Avenue on a 4-lane undived highway through commercial areas, where they become concurrent with SR 91 (Elizabethton Highway) and have an intersection with SR 362 (Gap Creek Road). US 321/SR 67/SR 91 then parallels the Watauga River before passing by a reconstructed interpretation of Fort Watauga at Sycamore Shoals State Park. The highway then passes through more commercial areas before entering downtown, where it becomes Broad Street and has an intersection with SR 400 before crossing the Doe River along the historic Broad Street Bridge and coming to an intersection with US 19E/SR 37 (Highway 19E), where SR 91 splits off and goes north along US 19E/SR 37 while US 321/SR 67 turns south along US 19E/SR 37.

Further on south, the four-laned highway crosses over the Doe River for a second time and then runs closely parallel with it. US 19E/US 321/SR 37/SR 67 starts gaining some gradual elevation and eventually crosses a series of bridges over the Doe River at the Valley Forge community just outside of the Elizabethton city limits (a left turn off SR 67 and onto Beck Moutanin Road after the first bridge is an alternative route to both the TVA Watauga Dam and the TVA Wilbur Dam).

SR 67 completes a final fourth and curving high double bridge crossing before arriving at Hampton.

Hampton

At Hampton, SR 67 and US 321 split off from the US 19E/SR 37 concurrency and continue eastward.  Here, the road begins as a two-lane segment, briefly passing by commercial areas in Hampton (including a U.S. post office, a Dollar General store and a non-attended public vehicle parking area for Appalachian Trail hikers arriving or entering the "AT" at Hampton), and then exiting Hampton over a high ridge.

Watauga Lake

Upon leaving Hampton, US 321/SR 67 again continually increases in elevation and roughly runs for several miles parallel to the shoreline of the massive Watauga Lake, through the Cherokee National Forest. Watauga Dam can be seen in the distance across the reservoir at the Rat Branch Boat Launch.

Johnson County

SR 67 passes through Butler before continuing northeastward up the Doe Creek Valley, where it passes through the communities of Doeville, Pandora, Doe Valley, and Dewey. During this stretch it passes by the Northeast Correctional Complex. At Doeville, it junctions with SR 167, which continues southeastward up the Roan Creek Valley to emerge in the Shouns Crossroads area of southern Mountain City. SR 67 then comes to an intersection with US 421/SR 34/SR 418, where SR 67 turns south and becomes concurrent with US 421/SR 34. They then bypass downtown to the west side, where they have an intersection with SR 418 before going through a commercial area as 4-lane undivided highway, where they a second intersection with SR 167 at Shouns Crossroads, before leaving Mountain City and continuing south, narrowing to 2-lanes. US 421/SR 34/SR 67 then pass through some rugged mountainous terrain before entering Trade, where SR 67 splits off from US 421/SR 34, becoming a secondary highway and heading eastward up the Jenkins Creek Valley toward North Carolina. At the state line, the roadway becomes North Carolina Highway 88 (NC 88).

History

In 1988, a stretch of State Route 67 was completed between Johnson City and Elizabethton as part of Quad-Cities Beltway projects.  The highway follows Cherokee Road through most of Johnson City before merging with US 321 (University Parkway) near East Tennessee State University, and continuing eastward.

In Elizbethton, SR 67 passes by a reconstructed interpretation of Fort Watauga at Sycamore Shoals State Park (the historical site of both the 1775 Transylvania Purchase and also the later staging area of the Overmountain Men, who crossed the mountains and defeated British Loyalists in South Carolina during the 1780 Battle of Kings Mountain)

Junction list

References

External links

Transportation in Carter County, Tennessee
067